{|

{{Infobox ship characteristics
|Hide header=
|Header caption=
|Ship type=Patrol vessel and minesweeper
|Ship displacement=
|Ship length=
|Ship beam=
|Ship draft= (mean)
|Ship power=
|Ship propulsion=Steam engine(s)
|Ship speed=
|Ship range=
|Ship capacity=
|Ship complement=36
|Ship armament=2 ×  guns, 2 × machine guns
|Ship notes=Built as commercial trawler 'Warren J. Courtney}}
|}

The first USS Courtney (SP-375) was a patrol boat and minesweeper in commission in the United States Navy from 1917–1919.Courtney was built in 1912 by Jackson and Sharp, Boat builders of Wilmington, Delaware, as Warren J. Courtney, a wooden-hulled steam fishing vessel of the "Menhaden Fisherman" design. The U.S. Navy acquired her from the C. E. Davis Packing Company of Reedville, Virginia, on 28 May 1917 for World War I service. She was designated SP-375, but before she could be put into commission as USS Warren J. Courtney the Navy shortened her compound name to the surname only under the terms of General order No. 314 promulgated on 28 July 1917. She thus was commissioned at the Norfolk Naval Shipyard at Portsmouth, Virginia, on 10 August 1917, as USS Courtney (SP-375).

Intended for service as a convoy escort and patrol craft for "distant service," Courtney was fitted out and then sailed for France. She convoyed and escorted transports and supply ships, operating out of Brest, France, as a unit of the Patrol Force, until operational difficulties – unseaworthiness – resulted in the restriction of the "Menhaden Fisherman" trawlers to minesweeping and coastal duties. Thus, Courtney operated as a minesweeper for the rest of her career and through the end of World War I on 11 November 1918.Courtney departed Brest for the United States with minesweeper  and other vessels on 27 April 1919. Although weather conditions appeared favorable, a storm developed shortly after their departure. The ships headed back toward Brest, but in the heavy seas, Courtney and Otis W. Douglas sank on 27 April. Courtney'' was struck from the Naval Vessel Register the same day.

References

NavSource Online: Section Patrol Craft Photo Archive Courtney (SP 375)

Patrol vessels of the United States
World War I patrol vessels of the United States
Ships built in Wilmington, Delaware
1912 ships
Minesweepers of the United States Navy
World War I minesweepers of the United States
Maritime incidents in 1919
Shipwrecks in the Atlantic Ocean